da Fiesole is an Italian surname. Notable people with the surname include:

Fra Giovanni da Fiesole ( 1395–1455), Italian painter
Mino da Fiesole ( 1429–1484), Italian sculptor

Italian-language surnames